Michael George Eilberg (born 6 October 1986) is a British dressage rider. Representing Great Britain, he competed at the 2014 World Equestrian Games and at two European Dressage Championships (in 2013 and 2015).

Altogether, Eilberg has won three team medals at various championships (one silver and two bronze). Meanwhile, his best individual championship result is 8th place in Grand Prix Freestyle at the 2014 World Equestrian Games.

References

Living people
1986 births
British male equestrians
British dressage riders